Grabsteinland III Herz der Finsternis is the tenth album of Untoten.

Track listing
"Irrlicht"– 1:39
"Mit Den Augen Der Nacht"– 3:20
"Herz der Finsternis"– 5:16
"Nachtgespenst"– 3:21
"Des Raben Flug"– 4:26
"Der Herzen viele ass ich"– 3:04
"Mit dem Wind"– 1:31
"Hexenfieber"– 2:37
"Dämonenwelt"– 4:10
"Du bleibst was du warst"– 2:18
"Raubtieraugen"-4:25
"Ankunft"-1:19
"Wintermärchen"-3:42
"Vollmondengel"-2:42
"Niemals niemals"-3:44
"Epilog"-4:54
"Abschied"-4:15

Info
 All tracks written and produced by David A. Line
 Male vocals by David A. Line
 Female vocals by Greta Csatlós
 Album artwork by Greta Csatlós

External links
 Untoten Discography Info

2005 albums
Untoten albums